Siempre Arriba (Eng.: Always On Top) is the title of a studio album released by norteño music group Bronco: El Gigante de America. This album became their first number-one hit on the Billboard Top Latin Albums chart and received a nomination for a Grammy Award for Best Mexican/Mexican-American Album.

Track listing
This information from Billboard.com
Estoy a Punto (Oswaldo Villarreal) — 3:19
Arriba (Humberto Galindo) — 3:20
Dalo Por Hecho (Nano Concha/Nicolás Urquiza) — 2:58
Un Hombre Con Suerte (José Guadalupe Esparza) — 2:56
Antes Que Tu (Marco Pérez/Fabián Tinoco/René Treviño) — 2:59
Soñandote (Eloy Mercado) — 2:34
Mi Peor Enemigo (Roberto Martínez) — 2:55
Corazón Borracho (René Esparza) — 3:21
Platicando a Solas (Oscar Ivan Treviño) — 2:51
Tumbame Con Tu Tumbao (Esparza) — 2:44
El Precio (Miguel Luna/Miguel Mendoza) — 3:32
Que Bailen los Niños (Esparza) — 2:41

Personnel
This information from Allmusic.
Ramiro Delgado González — Producer
Javier Villarreal Gutiérrez — Producer
José Luis Villarreal Gutiérrez — Producer
José Guadalupe Esparza Jiménez — Producer
Alfonso Valdéz — Engineer, mastering, mixing
Servando Cano — Musical direction
Carlos Latapi — Photography
Iver Soto — Assistant

Chart performance

References

2003 albums
Grupo Bronco albums